The Battle of Milazzo was fought on 17–24 July 1860 between Giuseppe Garibaldi's volunteers and the troops of the Kingdom of Two Sicilies at Milazzo, Sicily, then part of the Kingdom of Two Sicilies.

Colonel Ferdinando Beneventano del Bosco commanded the Milazzo garrison with 4,500 infantry and cavalry. Garibaldi's force consisted of about 4,000 men, under the command of Giacomo Medici and Enrico Cosenz. The main clash began in the early morning of 20 July outside the fortress located on a small peninsula, eventually forcing Bosco to retreat within the fortress. On 21 July, Garibaldi's Türkory started bombarding the fortress, followed by the arrival of Admiral Carlo Pellion di Persano's Piedmontese squadron. On 1 August, Bosco surrendered and was taken by ship to the Messina citadel commanded by Clary.

According to Scheid, "Garibaldi was master of Sicily." Commanding an army of over 40,000, he prepared over the next three weeks to cross the Straits of Messina.

See also
Risorgimento
Expedition of the Thousand

References

.

Milazzo
Milazzo
Milazzo
Milazzo
1860 in Italy
July 1860 events